Slovene Australians are Australian citizens who are fully or partially of Slovene descent or Slovenia-born people who reside in Australia.

History  
Central European people called Slovenians began migrating to Australia in the mid-nineteenth century .  Until the 1900s, there was only a small number of Slovenian immigrants to Australia.  The largest number of Slovenians migrated to Australia after World Wars One and Two . The exact number who came after WW1 is impossible to determine because Slovenians were often classified as Austrians.

After WW2, many Slovenian refugees migrated to Australia to escape death and persecution at the hands of Dictator Tito's totalitarian Communist regime.

Demographics

Numbers
In the 2001 Australian Census, 14,189 Australians declared that they were of Slovenian origin. In the 2006 Australian Census, 16,093 Australians declared that they were of Slovenian origin. Because many Slovenians came from the Austro-Hungarian Empire they identified themselves as Austrians.

Notable individuals 

 Paula Gruden
 Tanya Plibersek
 Lyenko Urbanchich
 Aurelio Vidmar
 Tony Vidmar
 Mitchell Starc
 Milan Faletic
 Dana Faletic
 Damian Mori
 Ivan Rijavec 
 Dayne Zorko
 Stan Rapotec

See also 

 European Australians
 Europeans in Oceania
 Immigration to Australia
 Slovene Americans
 Slovene Argentines
 Slovene Canadians

References

External links 
 History of immigration from Slovenia
 Slovenian community in Australia
 Historical Archives of Slovenians in Australia
 The Slovenian: An independent online magazine
 Slovenian Australian Network

European Australian
Argentine